Clueless (lit. "Blind Game") was a Polish game show hosted by Krzysztof Ibisz that ran from 2005 to 2007 on Polsat. This game show was known for showing amounts in the contestant's envelopes to the TV viewers (thanks to the on-screen graphics), while not showing those amounts to the contestant until the end of the game.

Gameplay 
Each game of Clueless consists of three parts:

Part 1: Picks
At the start of the game, the contestant picks several envelopes from a pool of 50 - initially they picked 10, then reduced to 8 and 5 in later episodes. Each envelope has a cheque with the smallest amount being 0 zlotys, and the highest being 100,000 zlotys. There are also two special cheques labeled -50% and -100%, which, if taken to the end of the game, reduce the contestant's final winnings by 50% and 100% respectively. 

The contents in each envelope is shown to home viewers, while the contestant does not know which envelope contains what amount.

Part 2: Questions
After picking the envelopes, the contestant is asked a series of multiple-choice questions, one for each envelope they have. The contestant is first shown the question, then chooses an envelope to play for in that question, before 4 possible answers are revealed. If the contestant answers correctly, they get to keep the chosen envelope. If not, they open the envelope to reveal the amount inside, then destroy the envelope using a paper shredder.

Part 3: Offers
After answering all questions, if the contestant has no envelopes left, the game ends immediately and the contestant leaves with nothing. Otherwise, the host offers an amount of money for one or more envelopes. The contestant can reject the offer; they can also suggest a new offer, but it has to be approved by the host. Once an offer is accepted, the traded envelopes are opened to reveal the amount inside, then destroyed in the same manner as Part 2. The contestant can also choose to open an envelope and immediately claim the amount inside.

Conclusion 
Once all envelopes have been opened, either as part of an offer or for the contestant to keep, the game ends. The contestant wins any money inside the envelope(s) they chose to keep as well as any money won as part of offers; this amount is reduced by 50% or 100% if the contestant chooses to keep the corresponding envelopes.

Memorable moments and statistics
A woman picked 5 envelopes with 100,000 zl in each one of them, but sold them all for 12,000 zl. The host gave her a reward for that, which was 20,000 zl. In all, she won 32,000 zl. This was the only time somebody picked these envelopes.

The most money ever won was 115,000 zl, win by Grasz czy nie grasz host Zygmunt Chajzer and journalist Agata Młynarska.

The least you could win is 6 zl and 25 gr, having 5 envelopes, a 100 and 4 -50%, and the highest is 500,000, each envelope containing 100,000.

International versions

References

Polish game shows